Paavo Juho Talvela (born Paavo Juho Thorén 19 February 1897, died 30 September 1973) was a Finnish general of the infantry, Knight of the Mannerheim Cross and a member of the Jäger movement. He participated in the Eastern Front of World War I, the Finnish Civil War, the Finnish Kinship Wars, the Winter War and the Continuation War.

Early life 

Paavo Juho Talvela (originally Thorén) was born 19 January 1897 to farmer parents Johan Fredrik Thorén and Helena Uino in Helsingin maalaiskunta. One of eleven children, Talvela enrolled in secondary education, but became involved in the Jäger Movement, where Finnish volunteers received military training in Germany, leaving for Germany in 1916. While in Germany, the Finnish volunteers formed the 27th Royal Prussian Jäger Battalion, fighting for the Imperial German Army on the Eastern Front of World War I. During this time, Talvela saw combat in battles in the regions of Misa and Gulf of Riga, but was sent to Sweden and Finland for "special tasks" in 1917. He was arrested on the Finno-Swedish border and detained by Swedish authorities for multiple months. In late 1917, Talvela was able to enter Finland by traveling to Turku via Åland. In December 1917, Talvela moved from Turku to Vimpeli, where he would act as a military instructor. During 1918, Talvela took part in the Finnish Civil War on the side of the Whites under the pseudonym Strömsten. In 1918, Talvela was promoted from the private-equivalent rank of jäger directly to a lieutenant of the Finnish Army.

Talvela was promoted to a major after the civil war, briefly commanding both a battalion and a regiment, but resigned in 1919 to participate as a regimental commander in the Kinship Wars of the 1920s. Talvela became the commander-in-chief of the Aunus expedition after it had reached Petrozavodsk. After the failure of the Aunus expedition, Talvela re-joined the Finnish Army, but continued to view efforts to integrate East Karelia to Finland as crucial for both the security and the economy of the newly-independent Finland. As such, Talvela resigned again in 1921 to command a battalion during the Viena expedition which also failed. Following these failures, Talvela joined the Finnish army the third time in 1922. Having returned to service, Talvela graduated from the English Coast Artillery School in 1923 before acting as the chief of coastal artillery in 1925. In 1926, he graduated from the Finnish War College, taking on the duties of commander of the Savo Jäger Regiment in 1926–1927. Following a 1925 promotion to lieutenant colonel, he was promoted a colonel in 1928. In 1930, he acted as the head of the Finnish General HQ's Operations Section, but conflicts with the head of the Finnish General Staff Martti Wallenius led to Talvela's third resignation.

Following his resignation, Talvela became politically active. He was a member of the electoral college for the President of Finland in 1931. He also became active in the right-wing Lapua Movement, organizing the Peasant March. The movement was disbanded in the wake of the Mäntsälä Rebellion. Afterwards, Talvela ran for parliament as a member of Kokoomus in 1936 but was not elected. Talvela was also active in various economic affairs, working as the deputy director of Suomi-Filmi from 1929 to 1932 and the Finnish state alcohol monopoly Oy Alkoholiliike Ab from 1932 to 1937, following the end of the Finnish prohibition. Concurrently with these duties, Talvela continued his activities in national defense, working as the chair of the Jäger Union to 1934 and in the governmental Defense Council.

Winter War and Continuation War 

The Finno-Soviet Winter War broke out on the morning of 30 November 1939 with a Soviet assault over the Finno-Soviet border on the Karelian Isthmus. In the lead-up to the war, Talvela had been promoted to a major general and became a member of the war materiel council, but just two days after the start of the war he approached the Finnish commander-in-chief Mannerheim asking for a field command. Talvela proposed that he should be given command of a regiment of the 7th Division, which was being held as commander-in-chief's reserve. On 6 December, Mannerheim ordered that the Finnish IV corps would be split into two commands, with one being given to Talvela. Talvela's orders were to halt and throw back the Soviet advance in the area of Tolvajärvi. 

The Finnish position in the Tolvajärvi region was in severe danger, and upon arriving in his area of operations Talvela's first task was to halt the retreat of Infantry Regiment 16. The following Battle of Tolvajärvi resulted in a Soviet retreat and the first Finnish victory of the war: The Soviet 139th Rifle Division lost its headquarters and most of its artillery. The 139th Division was replaced with the 75th Division, which was also forced to retreat just a few days later. Following these victories, the area saw only limited action to the end of the war. In February, Talvela was given command of the III Corps on the Karelian Isthmus in the area of Vuoksi and Lake Sukhodolskoye.

During the Interim Peace, in 1940, Talvela took part in the Finno-German negotiations regarding weapons shipments and the movement of German troops through Finland. He was made the chair of Suomen Aseveljien Liitto, the Union of Finnish Brothers-in-Arms.

At the start of the Continuation War in 1941, Talvela commanded the II Corps, but immediately following the start of the hostilities he was given command of the VI Corps. Under his command, the VI Corps participated in the Finnish invasion of Ladoga Karelia. As part of the Army of Karelia, VI Corps surrounded parts of the Soviet 7th Army north of Lake Ladoga. On 3 August 1941, Talvela was granted the Mannerheim Cross. The VI Corps reached Svir in September 1941, with the Finnish forces forming a 100 kilometer wide, 20 kilometer deep bridgehead over the river, thus cutting the Murmansk railroad. The Finns' refusal to advance further from Svir caused strain in the Finno-German relations, as German forces were able to reach a point some 80 kilometers to the southwest of the Finnish positions. The Germans had even moved the German 163rd Division to the Svir to help in securing the flanks for the "handshake at the Svir". The issue resolved itself once Soviet counter-attacks pushed the Germans further from the Svir in the south. In January 1942, Talvela was removed from his position as the commander of VI Corps and transferred to Germany, where he was the representative of the Finnish army in the German high command.

Talvela was recalled to Finland in February 1944. Having been promoted to lieutenant general in 1942, he was given command of the Aunus Group, which was in charge of the Finnish forces along the Svir. Following a Soviet landing in Tuloksa as part of the Soviet Svir–Petrozavodsk Offensive in 1944, the Finnish IV Corps, part of Talvela's Aunus Group, was in danger of being cut off. When the commander of VI Corps, general Aarne Blick, requested permission to pull back, Talvela refused and ordered the corps to instead conduct a delaying action. Blick ignored the orders, pulling VI Corps back, causing significant strain in the two commanders' personal relations. The animosity resulted in the replacement of Blick on 6 July. 

On 16 July 1944, the Aunus Group was disbanded and Talvela was ordered to return to Germany. He would stay in Germany until the Finno-Soviet cease-fire and the breaking of the Finno-German relations, both of which came as a surprise to him. Before leaving Germany, Talvela was approached by Himmler, who requested that Talvela would lead Finnish armed resistance. Talvela indicated that he would be willing to lead a resistance movement, but only under orders from Mannerheim.

Later life and legacy 

Talvela left the army in September 1944, returning to his job as the director of Pohjolan Liikenne which he had taken during the Interim Peace. As a result of the time he had spent in Germany during the war, he found working in Finland difficult, and lived in Rio de Janeiro selling cellulose between 1946 and 1949. Talvela returned to Finland in 1949, serving as a member of the City Council of Helsinki between 1954 and 1960. In 1958, he was the head consul for Philippines. He continued to be active in various activities related to paper production until his retirement. Talvela received his final promotion to the rank of general of the infantry in 1966.

Talvela married twice during his life. His first marriage with Martta Sofia Nikoskelainen ran from 1919 to 1922, ending in a divorce. He remarried in 1923 to Karin Johanna Tengman. During his marriages, Talvela had a total of four children, born between 1919 and 1926. He secretly had a fifth child born out of wedlock, Swedish writer Gunilla Boëthius in 1945; this wasn't discovered until long after his death. Talvela died on 30 September 1973 in Helsinki. He is buried in the Kulosaari Cemetery in Helsinki.

During his career, Talvela was granted several awards. The most notable of these is the Mannerheim Cross, which Talvela was the second to receive. He also received the Finnish Order of the Cross of Liberty and the Order of the White Rose. He also received the German Iron Cross (both 1st and 2nd class), German Cross in Gold and the Order of Merit of the German Eagle; the Swedish Order of the Sword and  Order of Vasa; the Order of the Crown of Italy; and the Norwegian Order of St. Olav.

Notes

References

External links 

1897 births
1973 deaths
People from Vantaa
People from Uusimaa Province (Grand Duchy of Finland)
Finnish generals
German Army personnel of World War I
People of the Finnish Civil War (White side)
Finnish military personnel of World War II
Knights of the Mannerheim Cross
Jägers of the Jäger Movement